The Ebert test gauges whether a computer-based synthesized voice can tell a joke with sufficient skill to cause people to laugh. It was proposed by film critic Roger Ebert at the 2011 TED conference as a challenge to software developers to have a computerized voice master the inflections, delivery, timing, and intonations of a speaking human. The test is similar to the Turing test proposed by Alan Turing in 1950 as a way to gauge a computer's ability to exhibit intelligent behavior by generating performance indistinguishable from a human being.

Ebert lost his voice after surgery to treat cancer. He employed a Scottish company called CereProc, which custom-tailors text-to-speech software for voiceless customers who record their voices at length before losing them, and mined tapes and DVD commentaries featuring Ebert to create a voice that sounded more like his own voice. He first publicly used the voice they devised for him in his March 2, 2010, appearance on The Oprah Winfrey Show.

References

External links
 Roger Ebert's appearance at TED conference 2011

Speech synthesis
Tests
Roger Ebert
Laughter
Siskel and Ebert